List of ambassadors of Albania may refer to:
List of ambassadors of Albania to Austria
List of ambassadors of Albania to China
List of ambassadors of Albania to France
List of ambassadors of Albania to Germany
List of ambassadors of Albania to Greece
List of ambassadors of Albania to Hungary
List of ambassadors of Albania to Italy
List of ambassadors of Albania to Russia
List of ambassadors of Albania to the United Kingdom
List of ambassadors of Albania to the United States

Lists of ambassadors by country of origin